Pierre Spitznagel, O. Carm. (1411–1465) was a Roman Catholic prelate who served as Auxiliary Bishop of Speyer (1444–1465).

Biography
Pierre Spitznagel was born in Frankfurt, Germany in 1411 and ordained a priest in the Order of the Brothers of the Blessed Virgin Mary of Mount Carmel. In 1444, he was appointed during the papacy of Pope Eugene IV as Auxiliary Bishop of Speyer and Titular Bishop of Myra. He served as Auxiliary Bishop of Speyer until his death in 1465. While bishop, he was the principal co-consecrator of Siegfried von Venningen, Bishop of Speyer (1456).

References 

15th-century Roman Catholic bishops in Bavaria
Bishops appointed by Pope Eugene IV
1411 births
1465 deaths
Clergy from Frankfurt
Carmelite bishops